Melattur may refer to:

 Melattur, Kerala, a town in the Indian state of Kerala
 Melattur, Tamil Nadu, a village in the Indian state of Tamil Nadu
 Melattur style, a variety of Bharata Natyam dance which originated in the Tamil village